James of England may refer to:
James I of England (1566–1625), King of England from 1603
James II of England (1633–1701), King of England from 1685 to 1688

See also
 James Francis Edward Stuart (1688–1766), Jacobite pretender to the British throne
 King James (disambiguation)
 Prince James (disambiguation)